is a city in western Tottori Prefecture, Japan. , the city had an estimated population of 146,139 in 68534 households and a population density of 1100 persons per km². It is the prefecture's second largest city after Tottori, and forms a commercial center of the western part of this prefecture.

Geography
Yonago is in far western Tottori Prefecture, and faces the Sea of Japan to the north and Lake Nakaumi to the northwest.  It is adjacent to Shimane Prefecture and across the lake from its capital of Matsue. The city limits are mostly flat, and the Hino River flows through the Yonago Plain. The southern part is a hilly area at the foot of Mount Daisen, and the mountainous area can be seen from the Yumigahama Peninsula in the northwest. The irrigation canal "Yonekawa" runs from Yonago City to Sakaiminato City as an intake of water from the Hino River.

Surrounding municipalities 
Tottori Prefecture
 Sakaiminato
 Daisen
 Nanbu
 Hōki
 HIezu
Shimane Prefecture
 Yasugi

Climate
Yonago has a humid subtropical climate (Köppen climate classification Cfa) with hot summers and cool winters. Precipitation is significant throughout the year, with July and September being particularly wet months.

Demography
Per Japanese census data, the population of Yonago has been slowly growing since the 1950s as follows.

Etymology
The name of Yonago in the Japanese language is formed from two kanji characters. The first, means "rice", and the second,  means "child".

History
The area of Yonago was part of ancient Hōki Province. Per the Kojiki, the tomb of the creator kami Izanami is located on the border of Yonago with neighboring Izumo Province, and many Yayoi period and Kofun period remains have been found within city limits. In the early Edo Period, the Tokugawa Shogunate appointed Nakamura Kazutada to be daimyō of the 175,000 koku Yonago Domain, and re constructed Yonago Castle. The center of the modern city of Yonago evolved from the jōkamachi of that castle. After Nakamura died without heir, the domain was abolished and its territories incorporated into the holdings of the Ikeda clan of Tottori Domain. The Ikeda retained Yonago Castle and assigned it to their hereditary karō from the Arao clan who ruled until the Meiji restoration. The town of Yonago was established within Aioi District of Tottori Prefecture with the creation of the modern municipalities system in October 1889. A post offices  founded in 1872, a prison in 1877, and a courthouse in 1884. Railway service was established in 1902.After becoming Saihaku County through county mergers, Yonago was raised to city status on April 1, 1927. Yonago absorbed the town of Yodoe (from Saihaku District) on March 31, 2005.

Government
Yonago has a mayor-council form of government with a directly elected mayor and a unicameral city council of 26 members. Yonago contributes nine members to the Tottori Prefectural Assembly. In terms of national politics, the city is part of Tottori 2nd district of the lower house of the Diet of Japan.

Mayor of town era (1889 to 1927)

Haruhiko Endo (遠藤春彦) December 1889 to April 1892
Yajiro Miyoshi (三好八次郎) May 1892 to December 1892
Seitaro Otsuka (大塚誠太郎) December 1892 to December 1896
Zenhei Sumida (住田善平) December 1896 to December 1900
Genjiro Kinemura (杵村源次郎) December 1900 to September 1901

Hayami Watanabe (渡辺駛水) October 1901 to October 1909
Kenji Hatotani (鳩谷兼次) December 1909 to December 1913
Tanji Niwa (丹羽旦次) December 1913 to December 1921
Tsunehiko Nishio (西尾常彦) April 1922 to March 1927

Mayor of city era (1927 to present)

Tsunehiko Nishio April 1927 to July 1943
Kanjo Saito (斎藤干城) August 1943 to December 1945
Kanji Nosaka (野坂寛治) December 1945 to April 1963
Hiromichi Kawai (河合弘道) April 1963 to April 1983

Toru Matsumoto (松本　徹) April 1983 to April 1991
Takatomo Morita (森田隆朝) April 1991 to April 2003
Yasuo Nosaka (野坂康夫) April 2003 to April 2017
Takashi Igi (伊木隆司) April 2017 to present

Economy 
Over 70% of the Yonago workforce is employed in the service sector.

Oji Paper has a production facility in Yonago. The city is also home to Sharp Yonago, which produces Sharp-brand flat screen televisions.

Education
Yonago has 23 public elementary schools and 11 public junior high schools operated by the town government and one private junior high school. The city has six public high schools operated by the Tottori Prefectural Board of Education and national public high school and five private high schools.  Tottori University has a campus located in Yonago. The prefecture also operates three special education schools for the handicapped.

Transportation

Airports
 Miho-Yonago Airport, located in a neighboring city of Sakaiminato. There are currently flights to and from Tokyo Haneda Airport.

Railway 
 JR West - San'in Line
 -  -  - 
 JR West - Hakubi Line

 JR West - Sakai Line
  -  -  -  -  -  -  -  -

Highways 
  Yonago Expressway
  San'in Expressway

Twin towns – sister cities

Yonago is twinned with:
 Baoding, China (1991)
 Sokcho, South Korea (1995)

Local attractions

National Historic Sites
 Yonago Castle - A castle ruin, one of the Continued Top 100 Japanese Castles.
Mukoeyama Kofun Cluster
Mukibanda Yayoi remains
Kamiyodo temple ruins
Kamiyodo temple ruins
Aoki Site
Fukuichi Site
Tottori Domain Battery Sites

Other
 Odaka Castle - A castle ruin in the Sengoku period
 Ōgamiyama Shrine
Yonago City Museum of Art
Kaike Onsen, which sits along the Miho Bay and is part of Yonago, is said to be the birthplace of the triathlon in Japan.

Notable people
 Sena Irie, Japanese boxer

Gallery

References

External links

 Yonago Tourist Association (in Japanese)
 

 
Populated coastal places in Japan
Cities in Tottori Prefecture
Port settlements in Japan